Peter Joseph Mahovlich (born October 10, 1946) is a Canadian former professional ice hockey player, coach and executive. Known in his playing years as "Little M", as his older brother Frank was the "Big M", Mahovlich played in the National Hockey League (NHL) with several clubs, including the Montreal Canadiens, where he played with his brother and was a member of four Stanley Cup championship teams.

Early life
Mahovlich played as a first baseman on his high school baseball team, beating out Gord Kirke for the position.

Playing career
Mahovlich was drafted second overall by the Detroit Red Wings in the 1963 NHL Amateur Draft. He played for the National Hockey League's Detroit Red Wings twice, Montreal Canadiens, Pittsburgh Penguins, the Ontario Hockey Association's Hamilton Red Wings, the AHL's Pittsburgh Hornets, Montreal Voyageurs, Adirondack Red Wings, the Central Hockey League's Fort Worth Wings and the IHL's Toledo Goaldiggers.

Mahovlich was an important contributor to the Canadiens' cup-winning teams of 1971, 1973, 1976 and 1977, before eventually being traded to the Pittsburgh Penguins. He enjoyed a breakout season in 1970–71, scoring 35 goals in the regular season and another 10 in the playoffs as the Canadiens won the championship. His best year came in 1974–75, when he racked up 117 points as part of a deep forward corps that included the likes of Guy Lafleur, Jacques Lemaire, Yvan Cournoyer, Steve Shutt and Bob Gainey. He hit the 100-point mark again the following year, finishing with 105.

Immensely popular as a Pittsburgh Penguin, cheers of "Pete, Pete" were common when Mahovlich made one of his end-to-end dashes up ice. He was characterized as easy-going, joyful, and a party-goer in Ken Dryden's book The Game.

In his 16-year NHL career, Mahovlich totalled 288 goals and 485 assists for 773 points in 884 games. Internationally, he was a member of the 1972 Summit Series, in which he scored a memorable shorthanded goal in Game 2 of the series. He also played on the 1976 Canada Cup team.

Post-playing career
After his retirement, Mahovlich was head coach of the Toledo Goaldiggers, IHL Colorado Rangers (co-coach), Denver Rangers, CHL Fort Worth Fire, and the AHL Cape Breton Oilers. He is also the brother of former Canadian Senator and former hockey star Frank Mahovlich. The two were teammates on the Red Wings from 1967 to 1969 and on the Canadiens from 1971 to 1974.

Mahovlich was a scout for the Edmonton Oilers from 1995 to 1997 before joining the Tampa Bay Lightning and then the Atlanta Thrashers. He is currently a pro scout for the Florida Panthers.

Career statistics

Regular season and playoffs

International

See also
List of family relations in the NHL

References

External links

1946 births
Living people
Adirondack Red Wings players
Atlanta Thrashers personnel
Canadian ice hockey coaches
Canadian ice hockey centres
Canadian people of Croatian descent
Detroit Red Wings draft picks
Detroit Red Wings players
Edmonton Oilers scouts
Florida Panthers scouts
Fort Worth Wings players
Hamilton Red Wings (OHA) players
Ice hockey people from Ontario
Montreal Canadiens players
Montreal Voyageurs players
National Hockey League first-round draft picks
New Jersey Devils announcers
Pittsburgh Hornets players
Pittsburgh Penguins players
Sportspeople from Timmins
Stanley Cup champions
Tampa Bay Lightning scouts
Toledo Goaldiggers players